Zanin is an Italian surname. Notable people with the surname include:

Bruno Zanin (born 1951), Italian actor and writer
Mario Zanin (1890–1958), papal diplomat
Mario Zanin (born 1940), Italian cyclist
Santo Zanin (born 1943), Brazilian footballer
Cristiano Zanin (born 1976), Brazilian lawyer that conducted president Lula's legal team.

See also
21301 Zanin, main-belt minor planet
Zanini

Italian-language surnames